The East Old Town Historic District, near Decatur, Alabama, is a historic district which was listed on the National Register of Historic Places in 2012.

It includes Greek Revival, and Bungalow/craftsman architecture.

The district includes NW Church Street to NW Wilson Street.

See also
West Old Town Historic District

References

Historic districts on the National Register of Historic Places in Alabama
National Register of Historic Places in Morgan County, Alabama
Greek Revival architecture in Alabama